Bedtime Stories is the sixth studio album by American singer Madonna. It was released on October 25, 1994, by Maverick and Sire Records. In order to move into a more mainstream sound, Madonna collaborated with Dallas Austin, Babyface, Dave Hall and Nellee Hooper, wanting to soften her image following the critical and commercial backlash she faced after releasing sexually explicit projects in the previous two years, notably the Erotica album, the Sex book and her leading role in the erotic thriller Body of Evidence. This image transformation was preceded by the ballad "I'll Remember" from the soundtrack to the 1994 film With Honors.

A Pop, R&B and hip hop album, Bedtime Stories explores lyrical themes of love, sorrow and romance, but with a toned-down, less sexual approach. Critics described the album as "autobiographical", as the song "Human Nature" addresses the controversy surrounding her previous projects. Madonna also worked with Icelandic singer Björk on the track "Bedtime Story", as she wanted to explore the British club musical scene, where genres such as dub had been growing in popularity.

To promote Bedtime Stories, Madonna performed the album's songs at the 1995 American Music Awards and the 1995 Brit Awards. A tour was also planned, but did not take place due to Madonna acquiring the title role in the 1996 musical film Evita. The album yielded two US Billboard Hot 100 top-three singles, "Secret" and "Take a Bow"; the latter stayed at number one for seven weeks on the chart. Its other singles, "Bedtime Story" and "Human Nature", were both top-ten hits on the UK Singles Chart. By the end of 1995, Madonna was named the Billboard Hot 100 Female Artist of the Year.

Bedtime Stories received generally positive reviews from music critics, who praised its candid lyrics and production, and was nominated for Best Pop Album at the 38th Grammy Awards. The album debuted and peaked at number three on the US Billboard 200 and was certified triple platinum by the Recording Industry Association of America (RIAA). It also became her fifth number-one album in Australia and charted within the top-five in many other countries, including Canada, France, Germany and the United Kingdom. Bedtime Stories has sold an estimated eight million copies worldwide.

Background 

In 1992, Madonna released her controversial Sex book and her fifth studio album Erotica, both containing explicit sexual imagery and pictures of voyeuristic fantasies. She also starred in the erotic thriller Body of Evidence. All releases were panned by critics and fans alike, calling Madonna a sexual renegade and claiming that "she had gone too far" and that her career was over. In early 1994, Madonna's appearance on David Letterman's talk show was noted for her controversial behavior. It included the singer using profanity that required censorship on television, and handing Letterman a pair of her panties and asking him to smell it. This made the episode the most censored in American network television talk-show history, while at the same time garnering the show some of the highest ratings it ever received. A song titled "I'll Remember" was included in the soundtrack of the film With Honors in early 1994. The song was well received by critics and was seen as Madonna's first positive step into reconnecting with the general public and repairing the damage that her provocative personality had caused to her career.

Regarding the controversial period of her career, Madonna said, "I feel I've been misunderstood. I tried to make a statement about feeling good about yourself and exploring your sexuality, but people took it to mean that everyone should go out and have sex with everyone, and that I was going to be the leader of that. So I decided to leave it alone because that's what everyone ended up concentrating on. Sex is such a taboo subject and it's such a distraction that I'd rather not even offer it up." During 1994, Madonna started recording her sixth studio album. She collaborated with R&B producers such as Dallas Austin, Dave "Jam" Hall, and Babyface, and also enlisting British producer Nellee Hooper to the project. It became one of the very few occasions where she collaborated with well-known producers, the first since Nile Rodgers on Like a Virgin (1984). When asked about the record, Madonna said she wanted people to concentrate on the musical aspects of it, and would like the songs to speak for themselves. She also commented that it was because she was not interested in giving many interviews and being on the cover of magazines. She described the album as "a combination of pop, R&B, hip-hop and a Madonna record. It's very, very romantic". In an interview with The Face magazine, Madonna explained her inspirations behind Bedtime Stories as well as the reason for teaming up with R&B song producers.
I've been in a reflective state of mind. I've done lot of soul searching and I just felt in a romantic mood when I was writing for [the album] so that's what I wrote about... I decided that I wanted to work with a whole bunch of different producers. [Icelandic singer-songwriter] Björk's album was one of my favorite for years—it's brilliantly produced. And I also wanted to work with Massive Attack. So obviously, he was on the list. Nellee was the last person I worked with, and it wasn't until then that I got a grip of what the sound of the whole record was, so I had to go back and redo a lot.

Development 

Madonna's initial work on the album had started with Shep Pettibone, who produced her fifth studio album, Erotica (1992). However, she found out that they were doing the same vein of music from the previous album, which did not please her. At the time, Madonna was a fan of Babyface's song "When Can I See You" (1994), and became interested in working with him, as she wanted "lush ballads" for her record. They would collaborate on three songs for the album in his studio in Beverly Hills, with "Forbidden Love" and "Take a Bow" ending up on the album. Recalling the latter's development, the producer commented, "I wasn't so much thinking about the charts. I think I was more in awe of the fact that I was working with Madonna. It was initially surreal, but then you get to know the person a little bit, and you calm down and then it's just work. And work is fun". He also said that for "Forbidden Love", "She heard the basic track and it all started coming out, melodies and everything... It was a much easier process than I thought it would be".

Madonna's backup singers Donna De Lory and Niki Haris were called in to provide harmonies on "Survival". She commented, "The minute you walked in [the studio], she was giving you the lyric sheet. That was the atmosphere—we're not here to just hang out. It's fun, but we're here to work and get this done". De Lory recalls the sessions for "Survival" took a "couple of hours" and there were no retakes. During recording sessions, Madonna was interested in working with Austin after he produced Joi's debut album The Pendulum Vibe (1994). According to the singer, "She wanted to know, 'Who is this? Who produced it? How did this happen?'"

Aside from this, however, Madonna also wanted to explore the British club musical scene, where genres such as dub had been growing in popularity. In such a way, she decided to work with several European producers and composers within the electronic scene, including Nellee Hooper, who pleased Madonna due to his "very European sensibility". Inviting Hooper over to Los Angeles, sessions started taking place in the Chappell Studios of Encino, California. Björk accepted the offer to write a track for Madonna's album, and wrote a song initially named "Let's Get Unconscious". Once the song demo had been finished, Hooper and Marius De Vries rearranged the track and the final version was called "Bedtime Story", which became the album's third single.

Music and lyrics 

A major sonic departure from her previous release, Bedtime Stories is a more straight-ahead R&B album. Its opening track, "Survival", is a "sweetly funky number" which tries to "convey a loosely drawn narrative of the punishment she endured from the media and her feelings leading up to the release". It has a lyrical allusion to the singer's 1986 single "Live to Tell", with double-tracked strong vocals and harmonies. In the song, Madonna enhanced the rhythmic sounds more and compressed the bass sounds, in order to cater to the then musical trend. Containing multiple hooks, "Survival"'s lyrics are about dualities like heaven/hell, up/down, angels/saints. "Secret", the second song, begins with just the sound of Madonna's voice singing over a rhythmic, folksy guitar in descending chord sequence, before opening up to a sparse, retro rhythm section. A deep percussion starts around the one minute mark, accompanied by wah-wah ascending string line, supporting the descending guitar. Towards the end, an upper harmonic melody is added to display variance. Madonna's voice remains at the center of the song's production, as she sings lyrics such as "happiness lies in your own hand". Throughout the song, Madonna also sings the lyrics "My baby's got a secret", however she never discloses what the secret may be. During the next song, "I'd Rather Be Your Lover", Madonna lusts after the unattainable through processes of negotiation: "I could be your sister, I could be your mother, We could be friends, I'd even be your brother". Towards the middle of the song, an eight bar rap break is taken by singer and rapper Meshell Ndegeocello, who raps: "Tell me what you want / Tell me what you need...". Madonna interrupts, with her voice foregrounded and juxtaposed over the short interjections of Ndegeocello's rap part. It uses a sample from "It's Your Thing" performed by Lou Donaldson.

The album's fourth track, "Don't Stop", is characterized by a pulsating bass overlaid with strings punctuating and accompanying the riffs in sustained and glissandi gestures. The rhetoric of the track is displayed by Madonna's commands: "Don't stop doin' what you're doin' baby, Don't stop, keep movin' keep groovin'". The next track "Inside of Me" starts with the same tempo as "Don't Stop", with guitars, sustained strings, "throbbing" bass and jazz-y keyboards, with Madonna singing in a breathy vocal register. The singing conjures an erotic imagery as she sings on the chorus, "Even though you're gone, love still carries on", however the lyrics were interpreted as both about her deceased mother, or a long-lost lover. The strings and an occasional saxophone sample makes "Inside of Me" a direct continuation of "Erotica", with an interval where the drums drop off, exposing Madonna's vocals. On the sixth track, "Human Nature", Madonna confronts chauvinism as she sings, "And I'm not sorry, I'm not your bitch, don't hang your shit on me", while telling herself in whispered tones to "express yourself, don't repress yourself". Consisting of heavy bass and looping drum sounds in its four chord sequence, the song finds Madonna delivering a nasal tone reminiscent of 90s soul style. Together with "Survival", the song became a vehicle for Madonna to lyrically vent off her frustrations regarding the controversies surrounding her.

"Forbidden Love", the seventh track on the album, finds Madonna comparing rejection to an aphrodisiac and dismissing any relationship untouched by taboo. Composed in a minor key with whispering voices in the background (one of them being of Babyface's), the song features a string section in the middle eight. The instrumentation is kept at minimum to emphasize the vocals, and the song ends with fading out. Track eight, "Love Tried to Welcome Me", is a ballad which was inspired by a stripper Madonna met in a club, and has a fetish about rejection. The first 42 seconds consist of a string section, following which the verses start. The song projects a sombre and melancholy mood with Madonna lyrically asserting that she is "drawn to sadness" and "loneliness has never been a stranger" on the song. The next song on Bedtime Stories is "Sanctuary" where Madonna quotes Walt Whitman's poem Vocalism in the lyrics, and aligns love and death. Musically it has a "techno pull" and has an atmospheric introduction with an assortment of odd noises, electric guitar and some strings. The song is linked to the beginning of the next album track, "Bedtime Story", which starts with its chords. It is an electronic song where Madonna wonders "Words are useless, especially sentences, They don't stand for anything, How could they explain how I feel?" The last song on the album "Take a Bow" is a midtempo pop ballad with a "Sukiyaki"-like Japanese touch. The chorus expresses the theme of saying goodbye to a lover who had taken her for granted. The title plays upon the verse in the song "all the world is a stage and everyone has their part", a reference to the line by William Shakespeare in his play As You Like It, "All the world's a stage, and all the men and women mere players".

Title and artwork 

The album takes its title after the song "Bedtime Story", written by Björk. Madonna liked Bedtime Stories as a title, as she felt it touched on the idea of "tales being told, of words you teach to children". Academic Georges Claude Guilbert, author of Madonna As Postmodern Myth, opined it was a pun and that the singer was referring to "(possible erotic) stories told at bedtime (in bed). In a way [the album] is really a book of stories you can tell your kids at bedtime [...] sexuality explained to children". Due to fear of backlash, Madonna hesitated and considered changing it, as she feared the public would "see innuendo and artifice where none was intended, imagine it meant songs for before you have sex". Eventually she gave up on the idea and thought "fuck it, it’s a beautiful title”.

The artwork for Bedtime Stories was shot by French fashion photographer Patrick Demarchelier, at the Eden Roc Miami Beach Hotel in the United States in August 1994. She also worked with hairstylist Sam McKnight for the pictures, which were directed by Fabien Baron. McKnight recalled that it was a "low-key" photoshoot featuring less than 50 people, and was conducted on Madonna's birthday, hence it was wrapped up fast since the singer had to go for her party. The cover was released online, and depicted the singer upside down, looking upward with heavy make-up, a nose ring, blond hair, and simple pastel colored fonts. Inspired by actress Jean Harlow, the singer sported over-plucked eyebrows for the photos which were designed by makeup artist Francois Nars.

Michael R. Smith from The Daily Vault website stated that the artwork was "colorful" and was seen by him as one of the high points of the release. While reviewing photographer Demarchelier's life and career, the cover was seen as "memorable" by Valentine de Badereau. The artwork of American singer Christina Aguilera's fifth studio album, Back to Basics (2006), received comparisons to Bedtime Stories cover for being too similar. The packaging for Bedtime Stories featured white plastic digitray holding the CD, while the cover was sky-blue paper with a velvety texture. British journalist Paul Du Noyer gave a detailed description of Madonna's image change with the album, during an interview with the singer for Q:
Madonna looks both older and younger than she does in the photos and the videos: a little more lined and possibly tired, but also less mature and grand. Her manner is quite teenaged, not femme fatale. She seems up for mischief, and yet quite conscious of her power. At the same time, her very frankness is almost innocent. These combinations are odd, and they give her the air of a prematurely wise child. Her current style is 1930s Hollywood meets early 1970s flash: Jean Harlow and Angie Bowie. She is not bewitching, but is certainly beautiful. She wears the nose stud that so troubled Norman Mailer in a recent interview. If you saw her in the street, you'd think: she looks like a girl who looks a bit like Madonna.

Promotion

Media appearances 

To promote the album's release, Madonna talked about the album in an audio message available exclusively online prior to its release. There were promotional advertisements aired on television channels proclaiming that there will be "no sexual references on the album" and Madonna adding that "it's a whole new me! I'm going to be a good girl, I swear." One of the first promotional appearances the singer did was in Paris, where she was interviewed by Ruby Wax and talked about the album. According to Wax, she was quite intimidated by Madonna and her entourage and, in her own words, "[my] nerves got the best of me". On February 18, 1995, Madonna arrived in Europe to promote Bedtime Stories; that same day, she appeared on German TV show Wetten, dass..?, where she was interviewed and performed "Secret" and "Take a Bow".

Madonna went back to United States and performed "Take a Bow" on the American Music Awards of 1995, accompanied by Babyface and a full orchestra. She returned to Europe to sing "Bedtime Story" during the 1995 Brit Awards; she wore a white Versace dress and long hair extensions, and featured a trio of satin-clad male dancers. Madonna invited Björk, who wrote the track, to feature in the performance; however, the singer turned it down. The singer also promoted "Take a Bow" by performing on Sanremo Music Festival. At the end of the performance, she thanked the audience in Italian language, and received standing ovation. In order to promote the video for "Bedtime Story", MTV aired a special titled Madonna's Pajama Party on March 18, 1995, where the singer could be seen reading a bedtime story in Webster Hall in New York City. At the event, "cutting-edge" tribal and trance remixes, made by disc jockey and producer Junior Vasquez, were also played.

Italian newspaper Corriere della Sera mentioned that Madonna would play in Italy as part of a world tour to promote Bedtime Stories in spring or fall 1995. However, Madonna and her manager Freddy DeMann cancelled all plans after she was offered the role of Eva Perón on the film Evita, directed by Alan Parker. Her spokesperson Liz Rosenberg considered a "shorter tour" because of filming, however, Madonna commented, "I've waited years for this role, and I have to put every ounce of concentration into it. I love touring, and I very much want to go out with this album. But I can't—I'd be going straight from months on the road right into filming; I'd be exhausted and strained. It wouldn't be in the best interests of the movie for me to be at any less than my peak of energy".

Singles 

"Secret" was released as the album's lead single on September 26, 1994. The song achieved success on record charts, peaking inside the top five in most countries, while reaching number three on the US Billboard Hot 100. In the UK, it became her 35th consecutive top-ten single since "Like a Virgin" (1984), which remains a record for any artist in British chart history. 

This string was broken by "Take a Bow", the second single which peaked at number 16 in the nation. However, it was a huge success in the US, topping the Hot 100 chart for seven weeks and is her longest-running number-one single on this chart. It was her 11th single to top the chart and her 23rd top five entry-both records for a female artist. She also replaced Carole King as the female who had written the most number one songs.

"Bedtime Story" was released as the third single in February 1995. On the Hot 100 chart, the song peaked at number 42, becoming the first Madonna single since "Burning Up" (1983) not to reach the top 40. If the single reached the top 40, Madonna would at the time have become the third woman in the "rock era" with the most top 40 hits, behind Aretha Franklin and Connie Francis. It would have given her a consecutive string of 33 top 40 hits, starting from her single "Holiday" (1983). Nonetheless, the song's "loss" of radio airplay and sales prevented it from peaking within the US top 40. 

"Human Nature" was released as the fourth and final single from Bedtime Stories in June 1995. Like the previous single, it failed to reach the top 40 in the US, peaking at number 46. However, the song reached the top 10 in several countries, including the UK. Duet to cummulative chart performances of the album's four singles throughout 1995, Madonna was named the Billboard Hot 100 Female Artist of the Year.

Critical reception 

Bedtime Stories received generally positive reviews from music critics. J. Randy Taraborrelli, author of Madonna: An Intimate Biography, praised the album for being "considerably more tame in tone and image than [Eroticas] ethereal sounding, sexually explicit" content. AllMusic critic Stephen Thomas Erlewine gave the album four out of five stars, claiming that it is a "warm album" and that it "offers her most humane and open music". Jim Farber from Entertainment Weekly gave the album a positive review as well, giving it a B+ grade, and writing that "the new tracks work less as individual songs than as a sustained mood" and that Madonna "still has something to reveal". Barbara O'Dair of Rolling Stone also gave the album a three-and-a-half stars out of five, writing that "Madonna has come up with awfully compelling sounds". Billboard, while giving the album a positive review, commented that it "sticks to a pop recipe that yields hits galore, with little excess baggage". In 2015, Billboard ranked it as Madonna's sixth best album; "while not as hardcore as 1992's Erotica, Bedtime captured Madonna in transition, swiveling away from explicit sexuality and relying on R&B and balladry before she dove headfirst into dance music four years later. Songs like 'Human Nature', 'Secret' and 'I'd Rather Be Your Lover' proved more compelling than most of the New Jack music being released in the mid-90s, and 'Take a Bow' added a classic slow jam to Madge's canon". Sal Cinquemani of Slant Magazine gave Bedtime Stories a positive review and four out of five stars, writing that it is "a fluffy-pillowed concept album that unfolds like a musical fairy tale". Writing for About.com, Bill Lamb asserts this "one of Madonna's warmest, most inviting albums musically".

The New York Times writer Stephen Holden considered Bedtime Stories as "easily Madonna's best album", and concluded that it was a "seductive mixture of soft-focus hip-hop and bittersweet ballads". Peter Galvin from The Advocate magazine gave a positive review, describing the album as "a gorgeously produced R&B album with lots of funky beats, lush keyboards, and soaring Love Unlimited-style string arrangements". Barry Walters from the San Francisco Examiner praised the album as Madonna's most low-key album and her best work at the date. J. D. Considine, while writing his review for the album for The Baltimore Sun, declared that Bedtime Stories was more listener-friendly than Madonna's previous albums. He added that it "seems remarkably close in spirit to the singer's first album, emphasizing dance grooves and pop melodies over genre exercises and conceptual statements", while praising Madonna's vocal performance. Linda L. Labin from the Bangor Daily News, noted that "[Madonna] isn't taking any chances. This time around, her daring has more to do with music than lyrics", while also praising her vocals; "If anything, her singing is the album's greatest strength. Madonna uses every trick from her repertoire. [...] Bedtime Stories turns in some of the strongest performances of her career. 'Madonna sings well' — bet you don't see that headline in the tabloids anytime soon". Chris Willman of the Los Angeles Times gave it two-stars-and-a-half out of four, writing that the album "seems the least remarkable of all Madonna's albums. But it's not necessarily the least of them. [...] It has a nice, consistently relaxed feel, its slow jams hip-hop-inflected but not as self-consciously as last time".

The Milwaukee Journals Tina Maples provided a mixed review for the album, criticizing its "hoary cliches" and "bland, mid-tempo soul-pop ballads that confuse sophistication with sonambulism", and added that with the album, Madonna was feeling the "fallout" of building her career on "shock value". However, she highlighted "Secret", "Bedtime Story" and "Take a Bow" as the standout tracks from Bedtime Stories. Steve Morse, writer from The Boston Globe, criticized the album for lacking "life", and being "flat and listless", and said that Madonna seemed lost throughout the album. Allen Metz and Carol Benson, authors of The Madonna Companion: Two Decades of Commentary, opined that "rather than signify(ing) some bold new direction for Madonna, Bedtime Stories takes hardly any risks at all. [...] it offers neither the pop epiphany of Like a Prayer nor the shameless frolic of Madonna's earlier dance hits".

Recognition 
British magazine NME ranked Bedtime Stories as the 30th best album of 1994. Billboard editors Larry Flick and Havelock Nelson included it among their list of the ten best albums of 1994. It also appeared in The Village Voices critic list Pazz & Jop at number 26. Slant Magazine included Bedtime Stories on their list of "The Best Albums of the 1990s" at number 63, with Cinquemani writing, "instead of simply following American trends of the time, Madge infused the album with the edgier trip-hop sounds that were happening on the other side of the pond. But it was her refined literary taste, from Proust to Whitman, and both the media and the public's rejection of her sexual politicking that truly informed the singer's seventh album." At the 38th Grammy Awards in 1996, the album received a nomination for Best Pop Album.

Commercial performance 

In the United States, Bedtime Stories debuted at number three on the Billboard 200 chart and number two on the  Cash Box Top 100 album charts on the issue date of November 12, 1994, with 145,000 units sold in its first week.  Despite a weaker debut than its predecessor, Erotica (1992), which opened at number two with sales of 167,000 copies, its chart longevity made Bedtime Stories outsell Erotica in the end. Following Madonna's appearance on the American Music Awards, sales of the album increased by 19%. It was certified triple platinum by the Recording Industry Association of America (RIAA) for shipments of more than three million units within the country. According to Nielsen SoundScan, the album has sold 2,336,000 copies as of December 2016. This figure does not include sales from music clubs such as BMG Music Clubs where it sold 195,000 copies. In Canada, the album entered the RPM Albums Chart at number four on November 7, 1994, and was certified double platinum by the Music Canada (MC) for shipments of 200,000 copies. In Brazil, Bedtime Stories was cerified platinum by Associação Brasileira dos Produtores de Discos (ABPD), denoting shipments of 250,000 copies. By February 1995, Madonna had sold 380,000 units in the latter country. In Argentina, the Cámara Argentina de Productores de Fonogramas y Videogramas (CAPIF) certified the album double platinum, which denotes 120,000 copies.

The album peaked at number two at the European Top 100 Albums, while reaching the top five of most countries of the continent. It sold over 2 million copies across Europe, earning a double platinum certification from the International Federation of the Phonographic Industry (IFPI). On November 5, 1994, Bedtime Stories debuted at number two on the UK Albums Chart, behind Bon Jovi's Cross Road. It remained a total of 30 weeks on the chart. The album was certified platinum on November 1, 1994, by the British Phonographic Industry (BPI), for shipments of 300,000 copies. Bedtime Stories also peaked at number two in France, staying in the top 10 for five weeks and remaining a total of 22 weeks on the chart. It became a number four hit in Germany, remaining 37 weeks on the German Albums Chart, and received a platinum certification by Bundesverband Musikindustrie (BVMI) after moving in excess of 500,000 copies in that market.

Bedtime Stories debuted at number one on the ARIA Charts on November 6, 1994, and remained on the chart for 30 weeks. The album was certified double platinum by the Australian Recording Industry Association (ARIA) for shipment of 140,000 copies. It experienced moderate success in New Zealand, debuting at its peak of number six, before dropping to number 16 the next week, and remaining for nine weeks in total. Bedtime Stories entered the Japanese Oricon Weekly Album Chart at number nine, continuing Madonna's uninterrupted streak of top ten hit albums there. In total, Bedtime Stories has sold an estimated 8 million copies worldwide.

Legacy 

Stan Hawkins from University of Leeds explained that Bedtime Stories "has been hailed by critics as a significant point of arrival in the artist's maturity by planting her firmly within new realms of production, performance, and songwriting". Mary von Aue of Vice noted that the initial marketing campaign of the album indicating it as an apology for the singer's sexually provocative imagery, and critics also hoped for a return to a more innocent form of music. However Madonna instead chose to portray herself as unapologetic, talked about the scrutiny that female musicians faced, and addressed her critics and people who had tried to shame her for being provocative. Von Aue added: "Bedtime Stories is not the first album that comes to mind in Madonna's legacy. It is, however, the most relevant to many of the cultural conversations that are still happening. Had she acquiesced to the public's call for apology, it could have set a dangerous standard for how the public can decree an artist's silence, and it would have allowed the categories for female singers to remain in place".

Saeed Saeed from The National stated that "Bedtime Stories may be considered as moderately successful by Madonna’s standards but it remains one of her most important creative statements." "Ray of Light may daunt some fans," Stuart Maconie wrote in a Q review of that album, "but then Bedtime Stories should have alerted them to the fact that Madonna is as much her own woman in her choice of musical company as her choice of underwear." Philadelphia's Patrick DeMarco described that "this was a record that cemented Madonna as the icon we know today". Jamieson Cox from Time called the album "underrated", while The Plain Dealers Troy Smith felt that it was "overlooked" because it was "sandwiched between her most controversial work (Erotica) and, arguably, her best (Ray of Light)". He praised songs like "Take a Bow" which he considered as "the best romantic ballad of her career".

Bianca Gracie of Idolator website wrote: "Bedtime Stories proved that Madonna never lost her edge; she just decided to soften it so that her image could regroup. When listening to the sultry undertones and R&B influences threaded throughout it, you come to realize how flawlessly the singer could change up her persona while still sounding genuine". Gracie believed that Bedtime Stories was an album with "timeless sound" and signified an evolution of Madonna as an artist, acting as a forerunner to her more experimental album Ray of Light (1998). However she noted how the album never let go of the sexual provocation associated with Madonna and how the singer chose to turn against what people expected from her at that time—being apologetic.

Many artists have cited inspiration towards this album. For example, deceased producer Sophie, who also collaborated with Madonna on her thirteenth album Rebel Heart, on "Bitch I'm Madonna", stated that "In my mind, Madonna created the blueprint for modern pop stars. Her creativity has gone further, wider and longer than anyone else I can think of; I feel like her songs have been consistently memorable and meaningful. I have loved all of Madonna's different phases at different points, but I think the Bedtime Stories era [1994] is really intriguing, especially the production – it has a unique feeling. It's so much more fully formed and sexy than a lot of the trip-hop stuff that was coming out around that time. It's definitely been an influence on my own music".

In April 2020, 25 years after its initial release, the album became the subject of a fan-led social media campaign amid the COVID-19 pandemic. Promoted on social media platforms with the hashtag #JusticeForBedtimeStories, the campaign resulted in the album reaching number one on the iTunes albums charts in several countries including the United States, Canada, Brazil, Ireland, Turkey, and top 10 in several countries worldwide such as United Kingdom, France, Mexico and Spain. After the fans campaign, the album gained a sizable increase in sales. Madonna confirmed her delight a few hours later on Twitter, expressing gratitude to all the fans in isolation for making this feat happen.

Track listing 

Notes
 signifies a remixer
 signifies an additional producer
Sample credits
 "I'd Rather Be Your Lover" contains samples of "It's Your Thing" performed by Lou Donaldson (originally by The Isley Brothers).
 "Inside of Me" samples "Back & Forth" performed by Aaliyah, "Outstanding" performed by The Gap Band and "The Trials of Life" performed by Gutter Snypes.
 "Human Nature" features samples of "What You Need" performed by Main Source.
 "Forbidden Love" contains samples of "Down Here on the Ground" performed by Grant Green.
 "Sanctuary" samples "Watermelon Man" performed by Herbie Hancock.

Personnel 
Adapted from Bedtime Stories album liner notes.

Madonna – vocals, songwriting, production
Dallas Austin – drums, keyboard
Babyface – synthesizer, background vocals
Donna De Lory – background vocals
Niki Haris – background vocals
Suzie Kattayama – conductor
Jessie Leavey – conductor
Tomi Martin – guitar
Me'Shell NdegéOcello – vocals, bass
Jessie Leavey – strings arrangement
Craig Armstrong – strings arrangement
Colin Wolfe – bass
Marius de Vries – production
Dave "Jam" Hall – production
Nellee Hooper – production
Darin Prindle – engineering
Alvin Speights – engineering
Michael Fossenkemper – engineering
Brad Gilderman – engineering
Mark "Spike" Stent – engineering
Jon Gass – audio mixing
Daniel Abraham – audio mixing

Charts

Weekly charts

Year-end charts

Certifications and sales

See also 
List of number-one albums in Australia during the 1990s

Notes

References

Bibliography

External links 
 
 
 Library + Archives: Bedtime Stories at the Rock and Roll Hall of Fame

1994 albums
Madonna albums
Albums produced by Dallas Austin
Albums produced by Nellee Hooper
Albums produced by Babyface (musician)
Albums produced by Madonna
Contemporary R&B albums by American artists
Hip hop albums by American artists